Sainte-Marguerite-du-Lac-Masson is a city in Les Pays-d'en-Haut Regional County Municipality in the Laurentides region of Quebec, Canada. It is partially named after and situated on the western shore of Lake Masson.

History

In the early 1860s, Édouard Masson (1826–1875), businessman and member of the Legislative Council of the Province of Canada from 1856 to 1864, invited many settlers to move to the former Terrebonne Seigneury and the surrounding area. In 1864, he was granted land in this area and contributed to the quick development of the parish, including the construction of a sawmill and a flour mill at the outflow of the lake which would be named after him later on. Also that same year, the Mission of Sainte-Marguerite was established, and the Parish Municipality of Sainte-Marguerite-du-Lac-Masson was officially formed, both named after Margaret of Antioch of the third century. In 1868, the Lac-Masson Post Office opened.

In 1959, the Town of Estérel was formed on the eastern side of Lake Masson when it separated from Sainte-Marguerite-du-Lac-Masson.

On October 10, 2001, the Parish Municipality of Sainte-Marguerite-du-Lac-Masson and the Town of Estérel were merged to become the Town of Sainte-Marguerite–Estérel. On January 1, 2006, after a municipal referendum, the Town of Estérel was re-established however and the Town of Sainte-Marguerite–Estérel reverted to its former name of Sainte-Marguerite-du-Lac-Masson.

Demographics 

Population trend:
 Population in 2021: 3367 (2016 to 2021 population change: 21.9%)
 Population in 2016: 2763 (2011 to 2016 population change: 0.8%)
 Population in 2011: 2740 (2006 to 2011 population change: 9.7%)
 Population in 2006: 2498 (2001 to 2006 population change: 15.1%)
 Population in 2001: 2170 (R)
 Population in 1996: 2251
 Population in 1991: 1571

(R) = Revised count.

Mother tongue:
 English as first language: 4.6%
 French as first language: 91.5%
 English and French as first language: 1%
 Other as first language: 2.7%

Education

Sir Wilfrid Laurier School Board operates English-language public schools:
 Saint Adèle Elementary School in Saint-Adèle
 Laurentian Regional High School in Lachute

See also
List of cities in Quebec

References

External links

Incorporated places in Laurentides
Cities and towns in Quebec